Voice Over Man is a Pakistani web television talk show. Voice over man a.k.a. Ata Ehteshamuddin is a character created and enacted by Wajahat Rauf. He has hosted over 70 episodes featuring mainstream celebrities including Mahira Khan, Humayun Saeed, Mehwish Hayat, Hania Aamir, Momina Mustehsan, Iqra Aziz, Aiman Khan, Minal Khan, Asim Azhar, Zara Noor Abbas and many others. The show's over the top humour, unusual questions and the host's antics and theatrics has made it one of the most watched online shows in the sub continent.

Overview 
The show is hosted and presented by Wajahat Rauf. It is produced under his banner Showcase Productions. It is released on YouTube by Rauf's official Youtube channel "Showcase TV" on 24 November 2017. The show completed 70 episodes as of 2020.

The show is available for streaming on the YouTube channel "Showcase tv".

Episodes

References

External links 

 
 Voice Over Man on YouTube

Pakistani television talk shows
Pakistani web series